The New York Riptide are a lacrosse team based in Uniondale, New York playing in the National Lacrosse League (NLL). The 2023 season is the team's 3rd season in the league.

Regular season

Current standings

Game log

Roster

Entry Draft
The 2022 NLL Entry Draft took place on September 10, 2022. The Riptide made the following selections:

References

New York Riptide
New York Riptide
New York Riptide